Guernsey Dam is an earthfill dam on the North Platte River in Platte County in the U.S. State of Wyoming. The dam creates Guernsey Reservoir, the last of the 5 major reservoirs on the North Platte River in Wyoming. The dam contains a hydroelectric plant capable of 6.4 megawatts of electricity. Morrison-Knudsen (Now URS Corporation) and Utah Construction Company constructed Guernsey Dam and the hydroelectric plant as part of the North Platte Project to provide irrigation to eastern Wyoming and western Nebraska. Guernsey helps control the river flow and stores water released from the project's primary storage upstream at Pathfinder Reservoir.

The reservoir is surrounded by Guernsey State Park.

See also
List of largest reservoirs of Wyoming

References

External links

Buildings and structures in Platte County, Wyoming
Historic American Engineering Record in Wyoming
Reservoirs in Wyoming
Dams in Wyoming
United States Bureau of Reclamation dams
Dams completed in 1928
Dams on the North Platte River
Landforms of Platte County, Wyoming
1928 establishments in Wyoming
Hydroelectric power plants in Wyoming